The Great Lake Relay is an annual team running event over approximately 160 km. It is held at Taupō, New Zealand on the third Saturday of February (not to be confused with the Great Lakes Relay held in Michigan in July). Each team consists of ten to eighteen members, either running or walking to complete the eighteen 4.7 km to 14.4 km legs around the largest lake in Australasia, Lake Taupo.

With over 5000 registered amateur and professional runners from all over Australasia taking part in the race each year, it is the biggest event of its type in the Southern Hemisphere. While there are prizes awarded to the winners of the relay, and $150,000 worth of spot prizes given away, most of the runners take part just for the joy of team building and participating.

Race

Qualifying
The Great Lake Relay is open to all runners and walkers, both male and female, of any age, ability and from any nation. For safety reasons however, the event is limited to the first 450 teams to complete an entry form, and pay the entry fee.

The Athletics New Zealand 100 km Championships, and the New Zealand 100 Mile Ultra Runners Road Championships have also been incorporated into this event in some years.

Grades
Teams or individuals may choose to participate in any one of the following five grades.

Runners: Running teams consist of 10-18 members. Each team member must run one or two legs.
Walkers:Walking teams consist of 10-18 members who must walk one or two legs.
Composite Teams (Runners and Walkers):Composite teams consist of 10-18 members who must complete one or two legs each. Legs 1, 3, 4, 9, 10, 15 & 16 must be completed by walkers. Team members may walk or run legs 2, 5, 6, 7, 8, 11, 12, 13, 14, 17 & 18.
Two Person Team (2x50km):Both members of this team must complete 50 km of the relay course, consecutively. This course starts 5 km into the fifth leg.
Individual (100 km):Competitors must be current members of Athletics NZ to be eligible for the NZ championship title. Each individual competitor must start 5 km into the fifth leg, and complete 100 km of the course by 6.00pm of the race day.

Start time
The relay uses a staggered "wave start" beginning at 9:00 pm Friday night for the walkers who have an estimated team time greater than 18 hrs. At 10:30 pm, the walkers who estimate to finish in less than 18 hrs, along with the composite teams with an estimated team time of more than 17 hrs 30 mins begin. The rest of the composite teams commence the race at 11:30 pm.

The first batch of runners starts at 2:00 am Saturday morning. These are the running teams who have an estimated team time greater than 14hrs. The final wave starts at 3:00 am. This includes the rest of the running teams, as well as the individuals and two person teams.

Course Description

Note: All distances are + or - 0.2

Event Records 
The race organizers keep a standard time clock for all entries, though official timekeeping ceases after 6.00pm on Saturday.

Course records up to 2007, are:

Relay

New Zealand 

 
International

References

External links

General Reference
 Official Great Lake Relay website
 Course map
 Great Lake Relay Results
 Sportzhub website

Photo and Video Stories
SportzVibes video from 2008 Great Lake Relay
Photos from 2008 Great Lake Relay

Athletics competitions in New Zealand
Taupō
Lake Taupō